The Church of San Bartolomé (Spanish: Iglesia Parroquial de San Bartolomé) is a church located in Tarazona de la Mancha, Spain. It was declared Bien de Interés Cultural in 1992.

Construction began in 1549 in a Renaissance-style; the church was only completed in 1694. The main portal resembles a triumphal arch. The main altar once had a very elaborate retablo, but it succumbed to arson in 1931.

References 

Churches in Castilla–La Mancha
Bien de Interés Cultural landmarks in the Province of Albacete
16th-century Roman Catholic church buildings in Spain
Renaissance architecture in Castilla–La Mancha
Roman Catholic churches completed in 1694
1694 establishments in Spain